Footlight is a serif typeface designed by Malaysian type designer Ong Chong Wah in 1986 for the Monotype Corporation. Footlight is an irregular design. It is sold in weights from light to extra-bold with matching italics. It was originally designed as an italic font, a roman version was later made.

Footlight MT
A version of Footlight's light style called "Footlight MT" (without italic) has been bundled with some Microsoft software.

Distribution
It has been distributed in the following products:
 Access 97 SR2
 Office 2000 Premium
 Office 2007
 Office 2007 Professional Edition
 Office 2010
 Office 4.3 Professional
 Office 97 Small Business Edition SR2
 Office 97 SR1a
 Office Professional Edition 2003
 PhotoDraw 2000
 Picture It! 2000
 Picture It! 2002
 Picture It! 98
 Publisher 2000
 Publisher 2007
 Publisher 97
 Publisher 98
 Windows Small Business Server 2003

Unicode
Footlight MT has support for the following Unicode blocks:
 Basic Latin
 Latin-1 Supplement

References

External links
 Microsoft Typography - Footlight MT
 Microsoft Typography - Footlight MT Light - Version 1.51
 Monotype's page for the entire Footlight family
 Identifont - Footlight

Monotype typefaces
Typefaces and fonts introduced in 1985
Display typefaces
Serif typefaces